Otto I (912–973), known as Otto the Great, was German king from 936 and Holy Roman Emperor from 962 to 973.

Otto I may also refer to:
Otto I, Duke of Saxony or Otto the Illustrious (died 912)
Otto I, Count of Chiny (died 987)
Otto I, Duke of Carinthia or Otto of Worms (c. 950–1004)
Otto I, Duke of Swabia and Bavaria (955–982)
Otto I, Marquess of Montferrat (died 991)
Otto I, Count of Savoy (1023–1057/1060)
Otto I, Count of Duras (fl. 1065)
Otto I, Margrave of Meissen (died 1067)
Otto I, Count of Scheyern (died 1072)
Otto I, Count of Scheyern-Dachau-Valley (fl. 1124)
Otto I, Count of Salm (died 1150), co-ruler of the County Palatine of the Rhine
Otto I (bishop of Freising) (c. 1114–1158)
Otto I, Duke of Bavaria or Otto the Redhead (1117–1183)
Otto I, Margrave of Brandenburg (c. 1128–1184)
Otto I, Count of Guelders and Zutphen (1150–1207)
Otto I, Count of Burgundy (c. 1170–1200), Count of Luxembourg
Otto I, Duke of Merania (1180–1234)
Otto I (bishop of Utrecht) or Otto van Gelre (1194–1215)
Otto I, Count of Oldenburg (died 1251)
Otto I, Duke of Brunswick-Lüneburg or Otto the Child (1204–1252)
Otto I, Count of Nassau (c. 1247–1290)
Otto I, Prince of Anhalt-Aschersleben (died 1304)
Otto I, Landgrave of Hesse (c. 1272–1328)
Otto I, Duke of Pomerania (1279–1344), Duke of Stettin
Otto I, Count of Schwerin (died 1357)
Otto I, Margrave of Hachberg-Sausenberg (1302–1384), also Margrave of Rötteln
Otto I, Duke of Brunswick-Göttingen or Otto the Evil (died 1394)
Otto I, Count Palatine of Mosbach (1390–1461)
Otto I, Duke of Brunswick-Harburg (1495–1549), Prince of Lüneburg
Otto I of Greece (1815–1867)
Otto, King of Bavaria (1848–1916)
Otto I of Austria or Otto von Habsburg (1912–2011), Crown Prince of Austria-Hungary

See also 
 Otto II (disambiguation)
 Otto III (disambiguation)
 Otto IV (disambiguation)
 Otto V (disambiguation)
 Otto VI
 Otto VII (disambiguation)
 Otto VIII (disambiguation)